Mhande is a traditional performance among the Shona people that incorporates music and dance. It is performed as part of the mutoro ceremony, the annual rain ritual of the Karanga.

Instruments used in Mhande include drums and leg rattles. Props in Mhande include ngundu (headgear), mbikiza (skirt in traditional dance) and fur skirts. One song sang in Mhande is Mhondoro dzinomwa. The drum pattern in Mhande is 12,1234,123.

Music of Mhande

The music of mhande is inseparable from the dance.  Similar to other forms of traditional Shona music, such as mbira, the music of mhande is characterized by its triple meter, cyclical structure, and polyrhythms.  These overlapping rhythms are generated between the two drummers, the dancers’ feet, the singers, and the makwa hand-clapping of other participants or audience members.  The music associated with mhande follows a distinctive rhythmic pattern of “1, 2 … 1, 2, 3, 4 … 1, 2, 3,” which distinguishes it from other ceremonial Shona music and dance styles, such as Mbende, or Jerusarema

Most mhande dancers are accompanied by two drummers, who use Shauro and Tsinhiro drums, hand clapping (makwa) from other people nearby, and rattles that are attached to the dancers’ legs to emphasize the rhythms made by their feet as they dance.  In some contexts, there may also be several marimbas involved in the ensemble.  One drummer takes the “call” rhythm on the Shauro drum, and the other takes the “response” rhythm on the Tsinhiro drum.

In traditional Shona indigenous religion, it is believed that music in ceremonial contexts can create an environment that allows people to fall into trance (vanonyaunyawa), and to be possessed by dzavadzimu, or ancestral spirits, in order to communicate through these spirits to gain insight from god.  Without both the music and the dance aspects of mhande, these spirits would not come to communicate.  However, mhande is also performed in competitive, celebratory, and non-ceremonial contexts.

There is a large repertoire of songs sung for mhande, each used to call different spirits, and each with their own origin stories, such as “Uya Uone” and “Pfumojena”.  The latter, “Pfumojena,” was sung during the revolution against British colonial rule, as a way to appeal to the spirits for help and strength in battle.  “Madzura Uswa” is a song that thanks the spirits for sending extreme rains, enough to wash away soil and crops, and warns farmers to build storm drains in the fields in order to prepare for this rain that the ancestors will send.

Cultural importance

Mhande is the enacted voice of Karanga epistemology. It is an important constituent of mutoro, the annual rain rituals in Karanga, and the kurova guva ceremonies. It involves singing, dancing, drumming, and hand clapping. Both rhythms, songs, and dances are used for communication with the majukwa rain spirits, and the spirits will deliver their wish and ask for the rain from the Creator, Musiki or Mwari. The ceremonies are often conducted on the Matonjeni sanctuary in the Matopo Hills, the native religious location in Karanga.  In addition, It can be regarded as a communicational device through which the ancestors can connect with their siblings.

The reason that people in Zimbabwe, especially in Karanga, hold the annual mutoro rituals is that they depend on agriculture to support their lives. There are two seasons in Zimbabwe: the wet season and the dry season. Therefore, whether agriculture in a year can be successful or not relies on the volume of rainfall in the rainy season. Mutoro rituals become the consensus for people to pray for rain.

Mhande is defined as an “embodied practice,”  and performed in style created by their forebears, and a methodology that illustrates their culture, which others are hard to access. Only adults are allowed to participate in these solemn and respected ceremonies, and children often learned Mhande through the teaching of their parents.

It is important to treat Mhande as a practical example that fits into their social background and the lives that the group of people lives in. Due to slavery, all music and dance express freedom. It greatly represents reality in a conceptual way.

Dance of Mhande

As mentioned above, Mhande dance and song are pretty inseparable and are a connected experience.  Mhande is defined as being a mixture of an indigenous song-dance performed for the mutoro ceremony, the annual rain ritual of the Karanga. The Mhande dance is not a traditional type of dance in which dancers are able to just perform to a song. This type of dance instead has an historical context and a deeper meaning. The Mhande dance  is performed by the midlands tribes and tradition is a very important aspect of the dance. This dance is a  type of dance that artistically expresses the values and beliefs of the rural Karanga of Shurugwi District of Zimbabwe. Mhande allows Zimbabweans and other performers to express the values through indigenous contexts: the Kurova guva and the Mutoro. The Kurova Guva is settling the spirit of the dead and the motoro ritual means rain making ritual.

The Mhande dance is a spiritual expression that personifies Karanga culture. Mhande dance is an ‘embodied practice’. The purpose of the dance is to communicate cultural knowledge that may not be accessible to the public. It incorporates singing and instrument playing along with dance movements to informally communicate the indigenous spiritual knowledge (chikaranga). The indigenous cultural knowledge is embodied in the movement “especially in highly stylized and coded movements we call dance”. The movement acknowledges the importance of history, existential experiences, social values, symbolism and other historical importances.

References

Shona
Rainmaking (ritual)